Yengica or Yengidzhe or may refer to:
Sisavan, Armenia
Yengidzha, Armenia
Yengica, Qabala, Azerbaijan
Yengicə, Azerbaijan

See also
Yengidzha (disambiguation)